Rakovskovo is a small village located in southeast Bulgaria, situated in Obshtina Nessebar, in the Burgas region.  It is made up of small farms and summer villas.  The village lies in the foothills of the Balkan mountains, and is within a 15-minute drive to the Black Sea beach town of Obzor.  As of 1 January 2006, the population of Rakovskovo was 103.

Villages in Burgas Province